Club Deportivo Atlántida is a Honduran soccer club based on La Ceiba, Honduras, founded in 1927.

The club currently plays in the Honduran second division.

History
In 1964, a triangular tournament was organized between three clubs from the Liga Dionisio de Herrera between Vida, Victoria and Atlántida; having Vida qualified for the first season of Honduran professional football.

Achievements
Segunda División
Winners (1): 1974

Atlántida Championship
Winners (1): 1948

League performance

Squad

See also
Football in Honduras

References

Football clubs in Honduras
1927 establishments in Honduras